Felipe Ignacio Laurino Varela (born 23 October 1989) is a Uruguayan football forward.

River Plate de Montevideo
In 2008 he transferred from the lower categories of C.A.Peñarol to the C.A River Plate Reserve.
Where the D.T was Juan Ramon Carrasco and Juan Carlos Carrasco. Leaving champion 2 years in a row in the Reserve category, where he was the top scorer in the championships with 20 and 18 goals respectively.
He debuted for River Plate de Montevideo on 20 August 2010 against Paraguayan Club Guaraní in the Copa Sudamericana competition.
His contractual relationship with C.A River Plate was from 2010 to 2012.

ŠKF Sereď
On 13 September 2012, he signed a contract with Slovak side ŠKF Sereď, along with compatriot Daniel Tucuna. He made his debut for ŠKF Sereď against Slovan Levice on 22 September 2012. The match ended in a 4 - 0 win for Felipe's new club Sereď and he also scored the final goal in the 90th minute.
He played 10 games in the Slovak league, and 5 more games for the Slovak Cup.
Where he scored 10 goals in 15 games.

Albion FC 
In 2013 he signed a contract with Albion FC. Team of the Third Division of Uruguayan soccer. It is the oldest and most historic team in Uruguayan soccer.
In 2017 he won the championship with Albion FC, winning the final against Colon. This final was played at the Centenario Stadium. Getting to lead Albion FC to the Second Division.
In 2018 he was Scorer of the Second Division championship with 14 goals. He also became the club's historic scorer.
His passage through Albion FC was from 2013 to 2019.

References

External links

1989 births
Living people
Uruguayan footballers
Association football forwards
Club Atlético River Plate (Montevideo) players
ŠKF Sereď players
Expatriate footballers in Slovakia
Uruguayan expatriate sportspeople in Slovakia
3. Liga (Slovakia) players
Footballers from Montevideo